Simard is a surname from Germanic sig (victory) and mar (famous), and may refer to:

 Albert Simard
 Amanda Simard
 Christian Simard
 Claude A. Simard
 Francis Simard
 Georges-Honoré Simard
 Mario Simard
 Nathalie Simard
 Raymond Simard
 Réal Simard
 René Simard
 René Simard (health professional)
 Sophie Simard
 Suzanne Simard
 Sylvain Simard
 Télesphore Simard (mayor)
 Télesphore Simard (MNA)

Places
Simard, Saône-et-Loire, a commune in the French region of Bourgogne
Simard Lake (disambiguation)

French-language surnames